Sir William Frederick Neill  (8 May 1889 – 3 January 1960) was a unionist politician in Northern Ireland.

Neill studied at Belfast Model School before becoming an estate agent. He was elected as an Ulster Unionist Party alderman on the Belfast Corporation in 1938, and served as Lord Mayor of Belfast  from 1946 to 1949. He was elected in the 1945 UK general election, for North Belfast, serving five years. He was knighted in 1948.  In 1954, he served as High Sheriff of Belfast, and then as Deputy Lord Mayor the following year.

References

External links 
 

1889 births
1960 deaths
High Sheriffs of Belfast
Lord Mayors of Belfast
Members of the Senate of Northern Ireland 1945–1949
Members of the Parliament of the United Kingdom for Belfast constituencies (since 1922)
UK MPs 1945–1950
Ulster Unionist Party members of the House of Commons of the United Kingdom
Ulster Unionist Party members of the Senate of Northern Ireland
Knights Bachelor